The Labour Party Irish Society is a socialist society affiliated to the British Labour Party.  It is a collective body of Labour Party members of Irish birth or descent, and those interested in Ireland and Irish affairs.  It promotes the interests of the Irish in Britain as a whole, and encourages Irish people to become involved in the Labour Party and politics generally. Former chair of the society, Matthew Doyle, has also said that it works to "ensure that the relationship between Britain and Ireland is marked by mutual respect and friendship rather than the prejudice, discrimination and violence of the past."

In recent years the society, chaired by Liam Conlon the son of Sue Gray, chief of staff-designate for His Majesty's Most Loyal Opposition, have campaigned on extending abortion and same-sex marriage rights to Northern Ireland, as well as working on the repeal the 8th campaign in the Republic of Ireland. The society was also involved in campaigning for the Irish Labour Party in the 2020 general election.

References

External links
 Official website

Labour Party (UK) socialist societies
Organisations based in the City of Westminster